Norvegia Point  (Norwegian: Kapp Norvegia), is a point 2 nautical miles (3.7 km) south of Cape Circoncision on the west side of the island of Bouvetøya. First roughly charted from the Valdivia in 1898 by a German expedition under Carl Chun. Recharted in December 1927 by a Norwegian expedition under Captain Harald Horntvedt. Named by Horntvedt after his expedition ship, the Norvegia I.

See also
Benn Skerries

References

Headlands of Bouvet Island